This is a list of units of administrative division of the Republic of Tatarstan, a federal subject of Russia.

Tatarstan is located in the center of the East European Plain, between the Volga and the Kama Rivers, stretching east towards the Ural Mountains.  It was originally established as the Tatar ASSR within the Russian SFSR on May 27, 1920 from Kazansky, Chistopolsky, Mamadyshsky, Sviyazhsky, Tetyushinsky, Laishevsky, and Spassky Uyezds of the former Kazan Governorate, Yelabuzhsky Uyezd of Ufa Governorate, as well as the part of Simbirsk, Samara, and Vyatka Governorates.  In 1922, Yelabuga with environs was transferred to the Tatar ASSR from Vyatka Governorate.

Initially, the territory of the ASSR was divided into ten kantons - Sviyazhsk, Tetyushi, Buinsk, Spassk, Chistopol, Menzelinsk, Bugulma, Arsk, Laishevo, and Mamadysh.  On the territories transferred to the Tatar ASSR in 1922, Yelabuga and Agryz kantons were established, while Chelny Kanton was separated from Menzelinsk Kanton. All kantons had roughly the same borders and the territory as the uyezds which preceded them, and preserved the division into volosts.

In the 1930s, kantons were finally abolished and replaced with forty-five districts (raions).  In 1935, they were broken down into smaller units, resulting in sixty districts. By 1940, the number of districts increased to forty-three and peaked at seventy in 1944–1955. By 1957, the number of districts decreased to sixty-three.

During the 1960s, some of the districts were merged, and their number diminished to thirty-seven. Only some of them were broken into smaller units again.  The number of districts stabilized at forty-three after Atninsky District was split from Arsky District in 1990.

In 1952–1953, the Tatar ASSR was administratively divided into three oblasts—Bugulma, Chistopol, and Kazan Oblast, but due to the oblasts' small sizes they were abolished in 1954.  On August 30, 1990, the Tatar ASSR became the first one to be elevated in status as a republic within the Russian SFSR, becoming the Republic of Tatarstan.

Administrative and municipal divisions

References

Tatarstan
Tatarstan